The 1977–78 Michigan Wolverines men's basketball team represented the University of Michigan in intercollegiate college basketball during the 1977–78 season. The team played its home games in the Crisler Arena in Ann Arbor, Michigan, and was a member of the Big Ten Conference.  Under the direction of head coach Johnny Orr, the team finished tied for fourth in the Big Ten Conference.    The team failed to earn an invitation to either the 1978 National Invitation Tournament or the 1978 NCAA Men's Division I Basketball Tournament. The team was ranked in the Associated Press Top Twenty-Five Poll for four of the season's seventeen weeks, reaching a number 8 ranking on December 6, 1977, and falling out after the December 20, 1977, poll.

Roster

Rankings

Team players drafted into the NBA
Six players from this team were selected in the NBA Draft. Hubbard accumulated no statistics.

References

Michigan
Michigan Wolverines men's basketball seasons
Michigan Wolve
Michigan Wolve